Aaron Green, known professionally as Mr. Green, is an American musician from Highland Park, New Jersey, United States. His project with Lee Scratch Perry combined over 20 different genres and styles of music.  He has produced dozens of songs that reached the Billboard charts including number one hit records.  He is most known for his unique methods of production, often incorporating street sounds Into his music via the Live from the Streets show.  He is also known for producing viral songs "If I Don't Go to Hell" (that got over a billion views on the TikTok app) and the original version of "Lay Lay".

Career 
Since 2007, Green has released his instrumental albums, including his Classic Beats series. So far, he has released four "Classic Beats" albums, and in late 2016, announced that he is working on a fifth edition featuring DJ Kool Herc.

Mr. Green and Sam Lipman-Stern’s web series “Live from the Streets” has been picked up by Vice.  In 2015, Green compiled the songs from the series onto the album with the same name. He links up with The Roots rapper Malik B for their collaborative LP Unpredictable, and the Roots used his video "Live from the Bedroom" to celebrate their debut episode of The Tonight Show starring Jimmy Falon.

In 2018, Green collaborated on the ep "FLYGOD is good... all the time" with Westside Gunn.  He also released over a dozen limited edition 7" vinyl records.  In 2019, Mr. Green collaborated with Lee "Scratch" Perry on the EP "Super Ape Vs. 緑: Open Door", featuring Eric Andre, Sheek Louch, Daniel Son and HR.  In 2020, a ninja project began, loosely based around the cut and paste movies of the 1980s, the first single featured Gucci Mane entitled "Gucci Ninja Assassins".  A second single was announced featuring Rick Ross, “Golden Ninja Empire (Yayo Ninjas)”.  The third and fourth singles were "Gucci Ninja Assassins 2: in the Metal Garden of Fire" feat. Gucci Mane and Supreme Ninja Training Montage feat. DMX. On Green's 27th birthday on June 29, 2021, a fifth ninja single feat. Lil Wayne was also released.  HotNewHipHop.com compared Mr. Greens inventive work to that of RZA from Wu Tang Clan. In August 2021, a sixth single featuring Jadakiss was also announced.

Discography
 Instrumental albums 
 2007 – Green Future 2009 – Classic Beats Vol. 1 2009 – Classic Beats Vol. 2 2011 – Classic Beats Vol. 3 2013 – Classic Beats Vol. 4: Ill Piano 2014 – One Day EP
 2016 – The Project2018 – The Last of the Classic Beats (narrated by Kool Herc) Volume 5 

Collaboration albums
 2008 – The Only Color That Matters Is Green (with Pace Won)
 2012 – One Crazy Weekend (with Young Zee)
 2012 – The Only Number That Matters Is Won (with Pace Won)
 2015 – Unpredictable (with Malik B)
 2018 – FLYGOD is Good... All the Time (with Westside Gunn)
2020 - "Gucci Ninja Assassins" with Gucci Mane
2020 - "Golden Ninja Empire (Yayo Ninjas)" with Rick Ross
2021 - "Gucci Ninja Assassins 2: In the Metal Garden of Fire" with Gucci Mane and Garden of Fire

 Compilation albums 
 2015 – Live from the Streets''

References

External links 
 Official website
livefromthestreets.com

Living people
Jewish American musicians
American hip hop record producers
People from Highland Park, New Jersey
21st-century American Jews
1994 births